Suresh Pachouri (born 1 July 1952) is an Indian politician and a member of the Indian National Congress from Madhya Pradesh. He had served as union minister of state in the Ministry of Defence (1995-1996) and in the Ministry of Personnel, Public Grievances and Pensions and Ministry of Parliamentary Affairs (2004-2008) in the Government of India.

Personal life
Pachouri was born on 1 July 1952 to Kalika Prasad. He graduated with a Bachelor of Engineering degree in mechanical engineering from Maulana Azad National Institute of Technology, Bhopal in 1983. He also received an LLB degree from Sofia Art and Commerce College, Bhopal in 2002. He is married to Suparna S. Pachouri, with whom he has two sons.

Political career
Pachouri is one of the senior most leaders of Indian National Congress and he entered politics as an Indian Youth Congress worker in 1972. He was the General Secretary of the Madhya Pradesh Youth Congress(I) from 1981 to 1983. He then became President of the Madhya Pradesh Youth Congress from 1984 to 1985. He was General Secretary of the Indian Youth Congress from 1985 to 1988. He was first elected to the Rajya Sabha in 1984 and was re-elected in 1990, 1996 & 2002. He was the Minister of State in the Ministry of Defence from 1995 to 1996. He was the Chairman of the Congress Seva Dal. He was a Member of the Consultative Committee of the Ministry of Home Affairs and Defence and was also nominated to the Panel of Deputy Chairman of the Rajya Sabha in 2000. He served as a Minister of State in the Ministry of Personnel, Public Grievances and Pensions and Ministry of Parliamentary Affairs from 24 May 2004 – 6 April 2008. He was the President of the Madhya Pradesh Congress Committee from 14 February 2008 – 5 April 2011. He has also served as the Convener of the Research and Coordination Department of the All India Congress Committee.

Positions held 
1981-83: General secretary of Madhya Pradesh Youth Congress
1984-85: President of Madhya Pradesh youth congress
1985-88: General secretary of Indian youth congress
1984-90: Member of parliament, Rajyasabha
1990: Member of consultative committee of Ministry of Home affairs and Defence
1990-96: Member of Parliament, Rajyasabha 
1995-96: Union minister of state for Defence Production
1996-2002: Member of parliament, Rajyasabha
2000: Vice chairman of Rajyasabha (Panel)
2002-2008: Member of Parliament, Rajyasabha
2004: Chief whip, Rajyasabha
2004-2008: Union minister of state in the Ministry of Personnel, Public Grievances, Pension and Ministry of Parliamentary Affairs
2008-2011: President of MP congress

References

1952 births
Living people
Rajya Sabha members from Madhya Pradesh
Indian National Congress politicians from Madhya Pradesh